Felin Hen Halt railway station was a station in Glasinfryn, Gwynedd, Wales on the Bethesda branch line. The station was opened on 1 July 1884 and closed on 3 December 1951.

References

Disused railway stations in Gwynedd
Railway stations in Great Britain opened in 1884
Railway stations in Great Britain closed in 1951
Former London and North Western Railway stations